Eberhard Carl (born 13 May 1965) is a former German football coach and a former player. He played in the top-tier Bundesliga for eight seasons with Karlsruher SC.

Playing career
In his youth, Carl played for VfL Nagold, Kehler FV, and SV Gündringen.

In 1986, he made his first-team debut with SV Böblingen in the Verbandsliga Württemberg and then moved to 1. FC Pforzheim in the Amateuroberliga BW in 1988.

In 1989, Carl moved to Karlsruher SC in the Bundesliga, where he played for eight years making 177 appearances in the top division, while making many appearances in the European Cup as well.  During the 1993–94 UEFA Cup, they advanced to the semi finals, ultimately losing to Austria Salzburg on away goals, defeating Valencia, PSV Eindhoven, Bordeaux and Boavista in the earlier rounds. In 1996, he advanced to the finals of the DFB-Pokal Final finishing as runner-up after losing to 1. FC Kaiserslautern in the final match.

In 1997, he moved to the 2. Bundesliga club Stuttgarter Kickers where he made 68 appearances in the second tier.

In 2000, he joined 1. FC Pforzheim.  He then joined TSV Haiterbach in 2001 and became a player-manager for the 2002–03 season. He then retired to become a full-time manager, but returned to becoming a player-manager with VfL Herrenberg in the Landesliga Württemberg.

Coaching career
After his player career, Carl became an amateur coach with TSV Haiterbach and SV Böblingen.
From 2005 to 2007, he coached VfL Herrenberg in the Landesliga in a player-manager role. Afterwards, he moved on to coach 1. FC Calmbach. In 2010, he became the coach for Phönix Lomersheim for three years, helping them get back to the Bezirksliga. In 2013, he became the sporting director at 1. CfR Pforzheim and the coach a year later. In 2017, Carl gave up his job at Pforzheim and moved to the district office, initially as a sports representative, but now he is one of eleven integration managers working with refugees.

Honours
 DFB-Pokal finalist: 1995–96

References

External links
 

1965 births
Living people
People from Calw (district)
Sportspeople from Karlsruhe (region)
Association football midfielders
German footballers
German football managers
1. FC Pforzheim players
Karlsruher SC players
Stuttgarter Kickers players
Bundesliga players
2. Bundesliga players
Footballers from Baden-Württemberg
VfL Nagold players
West German footballers